Guettarda scabra, commonly known as the rough velvetseed, is a species of plant in the family Rubiaceae native to the Neotropics.

References

scabra
Flora of Florida